Adolf Lindenbaum (12 June 1904 – August 1941) was a Polish-Jewish logician and mathematician best known for Lindenbaum's lemma and Lindenbaum–Tarski algebras.

He was born and brought up in Warsaw.  He earned a Ph.D. in 1928 under Wacław Sierpiński and habilitated at the University of Warsaw in 1934.  He published works on mathematical logic, set theory, cardinal and ordinal arithmetic, the axiom of choice, the continuum hypothesis, theory of functions, measure theory, point-set topology, geometry and real analysis.  He served as an assistant professor at the University of Warsaw from 1935 until the outbreak of war in September 1939.  He was Alfred Tarski's closest collaborator of the inter-war period.  Around the end of October or beginning of November 1935 he married Janina Hosiasson, a fellow logician of the Lwow–Warsaw school. He and his wife were adherents of logical empiricism, participated in and contributed to the international unity of science movement, and were members of the original Vienna Circle.  Sometime before the middle of August 1941 he and his sister Stefanja were shot to death in Naujoji Vilnia (Nowa Wilejka), 7 km east of Vilnius, by the occupying German forces or Lithuanian collaborators.

References

External links 

Adolf Lindenbaum entry at The Internet Encyclopedia Of Philosophy by Jan Woleński (includes a portrait)
 An Open Access article on Lindenbaum's life and works in Logica Universalis, Volume 8, Issue 3–4 (December 2014), pp 285–320 [note: the authors revisited the life of Adolf Lindenbaum in light of new research findings in a later non Open Access paper here.
Page on Sierpinski, contains fragments of his memoirs mentioning the murder of Lindenbaum

1904 births
1941 deaths
20th-century Polish philosophers
20th-century Polish mathematicians
Polish logicians
Polish Jews who died in the Holocaust
Polish set theorists
Polish people executed by Nazi Germany
Scientists from Warsaw
Victims of the Ponary massacre
Executed people from Masovian Voivodeship